Kudla may refer to:

Kudla (surname)
Kudla, South Australia, outer northern suburb of Adelaide
Kudla railway station
Mangalore, city in India, known as Kudla in the Tulu language

See also